Don't Be Afraid of the Dark, released in 1988, is American blues musician Robert Cray's follow-up to Strong Persuader. It was unable to match the mainstream success of Strong Persuader, peaking at number 32 on the Billboard 200 and staying on the chart for 60 weeks.

Track listing
"Don't Be Afraid of the Dark" (Dennis Walker) – 3:47
"Don't You Even Care?" (Cray) – 3:56
"Your Secret's Safe with Me" (Peter Boe, Dennis Walker) – 4:52
"I Can't Go Home" (Cray) – 4:23
"Night Patrol" (David Amy) – 4:43
"Acting This Way"  (Peter Boe, Richard Cousins) – 4:26
"Gotta Change the Rules" (Cray) – 3:24
"Across the Line"  (David Amy, Peter Boe, Cray, David Olson) – 4:07
"At Last"  (Cray, Patsy Sermersheim) – 3:30
"Laugh Out Loud" (Dennis Walker) – 4:20

Personnel 
Fidel Bell – assistant engineer
Peter Boe – keyboards
Charlie Brocco – mixing assistant
Richard Cousins – bass
Robert Cray – guitar, vocals
Bill Dashiell – engineer
Deborah Feingold – photography
Bernie Grundman – mastering
Jeff Hendrickson – mixing
Mike Kloster – assistant engineer
The Memphis Horns – arranger, horn, horn arrangements
Wayne Jackson – trombone, trumpet
Andrew Love – tenor saxophone
Dave Olson – drums
David Sanborn – alto saxophone on "Acting This Way"
Chris Thompson – design

Certifications and sales

References

External links
 [ Robert Cray's Don't Be Afraid of the Dark at Allmusic.com]

1988 albums
Robert Cray albums
Mercury Records albums
Grammy Award for Best Contemporary Blues Album